Courage Division 5 was a short lived English rugby union competition created as a tier 5 regional competition divided into Courage Division 5 North and Courage Division 5 South.  In 1993 the RFU decided to change the whole league structure, with a new national league (Courage Division League 4) replacing the old North / South regional system which would become the aforementioned Courage Division 5. This led to twelve out of thirteen teams in both Courage Division 4 regions dropping into Courage Division 5 while the league winners joined Courage Division 4 along with eight teams from Courage Division 3.  This system continued to the end of the 1995–96 season when the league was restructured once again – with Courage Division 4 being abolished as a national competition reverting to the old system only being renamed as National League 4 North and National League 4 South.

Original league composition 1993–94

Courage Division 4 – North
Birmingham & Solihull (promoted from Midlands 1)
Bradford & Bingley (promoted from North 1)
Durham City (relegated from 1992–93 Courage National 4 North)
Hereford (relegated from 1992–93 Courage National 4 North)
Kendal (relegated from 1992–93 Courage National 4 North)
Lichfield (relegated from 1992–93 Courage National 4 North)
Nuneaton (relegated from 1992–93 Courage National 4 North)
Preston Grasshoppers (relegated from 1992–93 Courage National 4 North)
Rotherham (relegated from 1992–93 Courage National 4 North)
Stoke-on-Trent (relegated from 1992–93 Courage National 4 North)
Stourbridge (relegated from 1992–93 Courage National 4 North)
Walsall (relegated from 1992–93 Courage National 4 North)
Winnington Park (relegated from 1992–93 Courage National 4 North)

Courage Division 4 – South
Basingstoke (relegated from 1992–93 Courage National 4 South)
Berry Hill (relegated from 1992–93 Courage National 4 South)
Camborne (relegated from 1992–93 Courage National 4 South)
High Wycombe (relegated from 1992–93 Courage National 4 South)
London Welsh (relegated from 1992–93 Courage National 4 South)
Lydney (relegated from 1992–93 Courage National 4 South)
Maidstone (relegated from 1992–93 Courage National 4 South)
Metropolitan Police (relegated from 1992–93 Courage National 4 South)
North Walsham (relegated from 1992–93 Courage National 4 South)
Reading (promoted from South West 1)
Southend (relegated from 1992–93 Courage National 4 South)
Tabard (promoted from London 1)
Weston-super-Mare (relegated from 1992–93 Courage National 4 South)

Courage Division 5 North honours

Courage Division 5 South honours

Notes

See also
 English rugby union system

References

External links
 NCA Rugby

1993–94 in English rugby union
1994–95 in English rugby union
1995–96 in English rugby union
Defunct rugby union leagues in the United Kingdom